Ridgewood (formerly known as DeKalb Avenue) was a train station in New York along the Evergreen Branch of the Long Island Rail Road. The station opened on July 14, 1878. DeKalb Avenue was renamed Ridgewood in June 1882. From the Greenpoint Terminal it took 15 minutes to get here. The station closed with the end of passenger service in 1894.

References

External links
EVERGREEN BRANCH: another lost LIRR line (Forgotten New York)
Arrts Archives THE L.I.R.R.'S  EVERGREEN BRANCH

Former Long Island Rail Road stations in New York City
Railway stations closed in 1894
Railway stations in the United States opened in 1878
Railway stations in Brooklyn
Bushwick, Brooklyn